Squat, squatter or squatting may refer to:

Body position 
 Squatting position, a sitting position where one's knees are folded with heels touching one's buttocks or back of the thighs
 Squat (exercise), a lower-body exercise in strength and conditioning

Computing and the Internet 
 Cybersquatting, refers to registering Internet domain names similar to popular trademarks with the intent to extort the trademark holder
 Squatting attack, a kind of computer attack

Law and property 
Squatting, the occupation of abandoned or unused building without the permission of the owner
Squatting (Australian history), historical Australian term referring to settlers occupying Crown land in order to graze livestock

Media and entertainment 
 Squat, a species of Flanimal from the More Flanimals and other books in the series
 Squat, the alternate name of the title character of Scott Adams' comic Plop: The Hairless Elbonian
 Squat dance, Slavic folk dance
 Squats (song), a 2015 song credited to Oh Snap! and Bombs Away
 Squatter (game), an Australian board game
 Squatters (film), a 2014 movie starring Richard Dreyfuss

Science 
 Squat effect, in hydrodynamics
 Bob and squat, the pitching motion of bicycle suspensions when under acceleration

Other uses
 Squatter pigeon (Geophaps scripta), a species of bird

See also